IBM defines optical storage as "any storage method that uses a laser to store and retrieve data from optical media." Britannica notes that it "uses low-power laser beams to record and retrieve digital (binary) data." Compact disc (CD) and DVD are examples of optical media.

Overview
Optical storage is the storage of data on an optically readable medium. Data is recorded by making marks in a pattern that can be read back with the aid of light, usually a beam of laser light precisely focused on a spinning optical disc. An older example of optical storage that does not require the use of computers, is microform. There are other means of optically storing data and new methods are in development. An optical disc drive is a device in a computer that can read CD-ROMs or other optical discs, such as DVDs and Blu-ray discs. Optical storage differs from other data storage techniques that make use of other technologies such as magnetism, such as floppy disks and hard disks, or semiconductors, such as flash memory.

Optical storage in the form of discs grants the ability to record onto a compact disc in real time. Compact discs held many advantages over audio tape players, such as higher sound quality and the ability to play back digital sound. Optical storage also gained importance for its green qualities and its efficiency with high energies.

Optical storage can range from a single drive reading a single CD-ROM to multiple drives reading multiple discs such as an optical jukebox. Single CDs (compact discs) can hold around 700 MB (megabytes) and optical jukeboxes can hold much more. Single-layer DVDs can hold 4.7 GB, while dual-layered can hold 8.5 GB. This can be doubled to 9.4 GB and 17 GB by making the DVDs double-sided, with readable surfaces on both sides of the disc. HD DVDs were able to store 15 GB with a single-layer and 30 GB with a dual-layer. Blu-ray discs, which won the HDTV optical format war by defeating HD DVDs, can hold 25 GB for single-layer, 50 GB for dual-layer and up to 128 GB for quad-layer discs. Optical storage includes CDs and DVDs.

History

In 1985, the New York Times said about optical storage, "the rumor refuses to die."

The 1978-introduced LaserDisc and 1982-introduced audio/music CD had made a data-storing optical media format, introduced in 1984 at a trade show, seem feasible.

In 2005, the patent for an Optical Storage Device in the form of a compact disc recorder was published by Peter J. Keller and Michael J. Kelley.

The Optical Storage Technology Association (OSTA) was an international trade association formed to promote the use of recordable optical data storage technologies and products.

See also
5D optical data storage
3D optical data storage

References

Storage media